Mount Judah is an 8,243-foot-elevation (2,512 meter) mountain summit in Placer County, California, United States.

Description
Mount Judah is located one mile southeast of Donner Pass at Sugar Bowl Ski Resort, on land managed by Tahoe National Forest. It is situated on the crest of the Sierra Nevada mountain range, with precipitation runoff from the peak draining west to South Yuba River, and east to the Truckee River. The Pacific Crest Trail traverses the west slope of the peak, providing an approach option from Donner Pass. The 4.35-mile Mt. Judah Loop Trail takes hikers across the summit, and is the most popular trail in the Donner Pass area.

History

This landform's toponym was officially adopted October 18, 1940, by the U.S. Board on Geographic Names to honor Theodore Judah (1826–1863), an American civil engineer who played a leading part in the promotion and design of the First Transcontinental Railroad.

President Abraham Lincoln supported a transcontinental railroad to Northern California, and in 1862 signed the Pacific Railroad Acts to begin construction. The Sierra Nevada posed a major obstacle to the project, and Theodore Judah decided the best route for the railroad was through Donner Pass as it required only one summit crossing rather than two required of other possible options. The 1865 route originally traversed steep cliffs of Donner Peak via tunnels and snow sheds before the 10,322-foot-long (3,146 m) Tunnel #41 running under Mount Judah opened in 1925.

The California Trail, which crossed Roller Pass between Mount Lincoln and Mount Judah, was one of the wagon trails through Donner Pass used by pioneers on the way to Sutter's Fort. In April 1846, 90 people departed Springfield, Illinois, en route to California. The ill-fated journey of the Donner Party tragically ended nearby when they were snowbound at Donner Lake before they could cross this pass.

Climate
According to the Köppen climate classification system, Mount Judah is located in an alpine climate zone. Most weather fronts originate in the Pacific Ocean and travel east toward the Sierra Nevada mountains. As fronts approach, they are forced upward by the peaks (orographic lift), causing them to drop their moisture in the form of rain or snowfall onto the range. This climate supports five ski areas at Donner Pass.

Gallery

See also
 
 Sugar Bowl Ski Resort

References

External links
 Weather forecast: Mount Judah
 Mt. Judah Loop Trail: Outdoorproject.com

North American 2000 m summits
Mountains of Northern California
Tahoe National Forest
Mountains of the Sierra Nevada (United States)
Mountains of Placer County, California